Varese Nord railway station is a railway station in the town and comune of Varese, in the region of Lombardy, northern Italy. It is located on the Milan-Saronno railway. The station is currently managed by Ferrovienord (FN). Train services are operated by the lombard railway company Trenord.

Location
Varese Nordrailway station is situated at Piazzale Trento. It should not be confused with the town's other railway stations, Varese and Varese Casbeno.

Movement
The station is served by  cadenced   regional trains operated by Trenord as part of the service contract entered into with the government of the Lombardy Region.

See also

History of rail transport in Italy
List of railway stations in Lombardy
Rail transport in Italy
Railway stations in Italy

References

External links

Operator's official website 

Railway stations in Varese
Railway stations opened in 1885